The Cinisara is a cattle breed from the province of Palermo, in the Italian island of Sicily. It is one of the 16 minor Italian cattle breeds of limited diffusion. The breed is recognised and protected by the Ministero delle Politiche Agricole Alimentari e Forestali, the Italian ministry of agriculture.

References

Ark of Taste foods